The High Eifel ( or Hohe Eifel) forms part of the Eifel Mountains in the German state of Rhineland-Palatinate.

The landscape here between Adenau, Mendig and Daun rises to a height of 747 m. The region is not to be confused with the western Hocheifel, better known as the Schnee Eifel.
Nürburg Castle and the famous Nürburgring racing track are located in the northwest of the area.

Climate   

Despite being between 600 m and 700 m high the High Eifel lies in the rain shadow of the Schneifel to the west. Its annual precipitation lies between 800 mm and 1000 mm.

Mountains/castles  

 Hohe Acht (747 m)
 Nürburg Castle (678 m)
 Hochkelberg (675 m)
 Dreiser Höhe (611 m)

See also

 Maifeld
 Pellenz
 Vordereifel
 Vulkan Eifel

Landscapes of Rhineland-Palatinate
Pleistocene volcanism
Volcanism of Germany
Regions of the Eifel